Margret Safatiya Mbeba was a Zambian politician. She served as a member of the National Assembly for Kazimuli from 1964 to 1968 and was jointly one of the first elected female MPs in Zambia.

Biography
A member of the United National Independence Party (UNIP), Mbeba contested the Kazimuli constituency in the  January 1964 general elections as the UNIP candidate. She was elected to the Legislative Council, one of the three women elected alongside Ester Banda and Nakatindi Yeta Nganga. At independence later in 1964, the Legislative Council became the National Assembly. She lost her seat in the 1968 elections.

References

20th-century Zambian women politicians
20th-century Zambian politicians
United National Independence Party politicians
Members of the Legislative Council of Northern Rhodesia
Members of the National Assembly of Zambia
Possibly living people
Year of birth missing